Gregory Anthony Halman (August 26, 1987 – November 21, 2011) was a Dutch professional baseball outfielder. He also played internationally with the Dutch national team in the 2009 World Baseball Classic. He died of stab wounds in Rotterdam after the 2011 MLB season. His brother was arrested in connection with the stabbing but was acquitted on the grounds of temporary insanity.

Career

Netherlands 
Halman made his debut at sixteen years of age at the Dutch major league team of Corendon Kinheim in Haarlem in 2003. Like his father, Eddy, and his younger brother, Jason, Greg played on the Dutch national baseball team. His sister, Naomi, is a professional basketball player in Europe.

Halman played for the Netherlands in the 2009 World Baseball Classic.

Seattle Mariners 

Halman was signed as a non-drafted free agent by the Seattle Mariners on June 26, 2004. He participated in the 2004 Mariners Arizona Instructional League playing for the Peoria Javelinas.
He played all three outfield positions. He recorded a season-high three RBIs on July 9 against the Arizona League Royals. He went 4 for 5 with a run and first career home run on July 10 against the Arizona League Giants. Halman hit .438 against lefties, compared to .219 against right-handed pitchers. He participated in the 2005 Arizona Instructional League.

In 2006, he hit .259 with 5 home runs and 15 RBI in 28 games for the Low-A Everett AquaSox. He finished 3rd on the team with 10 stolen bases. He hit safely in 21 of 28 games. He recorded a season-high 12-game hit streak, batting .309 from June 21 to July 4. He had eight multi-hit games, including a season-high three hits on July 19. He was placed on the disabled list on July 22 through the remainder of the season with a fractured right hand.

In , Halman showed his power potential by hitting 20 home runs combined for Everett and Single-A Wisconsin. He was named to the Short-Season A and Northwest League All-Star teams and was also named the Short-Season A Player of the Year. For , he was promoted to High-A High Desert to start the season. After batting .268 with 19 home runs and 53 RBI in 67 games, he was promoted in 2009 to Double-A West Tenn where he hit 10 more home runs. He ended the season with 29 total home runs and 31 stolen bases, which led him to be named the Mariners' Minor League Player of the Year.

On September 22, 2010, Halman was called up by the Seattle Mariners along with four other players following the conclusion of the Tacoma Rainiers season.

On June 3, 2011, Halman was called up to replace struggling outfielder Michael Saunders, who was optioned to Triple-A Tacoma. Halman hit his first home run in the big leagues on June 15 in a 3–1 victory over the Los Angeles Angels.

Personal life 

Halman spoke four languages: Dutch, English, Spanish, and Papiamento. He grew up speaking Dutch and English and learned Spanish in 2005, his first year in the United States. He graduated from Mendel College in North Holland in June 2004.

Death 

On November 21, 2011, Halman died of blood loss in Rotterdam from a laceration to his carotid artery.  He was 24 years old.  His brother, Jason Halman, was arrested for the killing.

On August 16, 2012, Dutch authorities released Jason Halman from custody, after prosecutors agreed with defense counsel that Jason, at the time of the stabbing, had been suffering from a psychosis that had been induced in part by his use of marijuana.  Jason agreed to be under the supervision of a probation officer and that he would undergo mental health treatment.  A Dutch court then formally acquitted Jason on August 30, 2012, on the ground of temporary insanity.  The court also allowed Jason to go free, stating that psychiatric and psychological assessments of him had found that there was "only a remote chance of any reoccurrence" and that it was "well possible that the psychosis [had] been a singular event."

Greg was buried in a small grove near the sea.  The spot was chosen because the plot reminded his family of a baseball diamond.

He was the first former Major League Baseball player known to have died in the Netherlands.

See also
 List of baseball players who died during their careers

References

External links 

1987 births
2009 World Baseball Classic players
2011 deaths
Arizona League Mariners players
Deaths by stabbing in the Netherlands
Dutch expatriate baseball players in the United States
Dutch murder victims
Dutch people of Aruban descent
Everett AquaSox players
Fratricides
High Desert Mavericks players
Major League Baseball players from the Netherlands
2011 murders in the Netherlands
Male murder victims
People murdered in the Netherlands
Peoria Javelinas players
Seattle Mariners players
Sportspeople from Haarlem
Tacoma Rainiers players
West Tennessee Diamond Jaxx players
Wisconsin Timber Rattlers players
Corendon Kinheim players